was one of four s built for the Imperial Japanese Navy during World War II.

Background and description
The Japanese called these ships  Kaibōkan, "ocean defence ships", (Kai = sea, ocean, Bo = defence, Kan = ship), to denote a multi-purpose vessel. They were initially intended for patrol and fishery protection, minesweeping and as convoy escorts.

The main armament of the Shimushu class consisted of three Type 3  guns in single mounts, one superfiring pair aft and one mount forward of the superstructure. They were built with four Type 96  anti-aircraft guns in two twin-gun mounts, but the total was increased to 15 guns by August 1943. A dozen depth charges were stowed aboard initially, but this was doubled in May 1942 when their minesweeping gear was removed. The anti-submarine weaponry later rose to 60 depth charges with a Type 97  trench mortar and six depth charge throwers.

Construction and career
Like her sister ship , Hachijo spent most of her early career in the Kuriles escorting ships.  On 19 February 1943, Hachijo barely missed meeting her doom when she was detached from escorting Akagane Maru to Attu in the morning. That evening, Akagane Maru ran into the heavy cruiser  with two destroyers and was sunk.

On 7 July 1944 Hachijo was severely damaged in an air attack, taking damage to her hull and an auxiliary engine room was flooded. Hachijo survived the war and was scrapped on 30 April 1948.

Notes

References

External links 
 Hachijo at Combined fleet (Retrieved on November 7, 2007)

World War II naval ships of Japan
Shimushu-class escort ships
1940 ships
Ships built by Sasebo Naval Arsenal